The County Courts are courts within the New York State Unified Court System located in each county outside New York City. In New York City, criminal and civil matters are heard in the city Criminal Court and Civil Court, respectively, or the state Supreme Court.

Jurisdiction 
The court has unlimited criminal jurisdiction and civil jurisdiction where the amount in controversy is no more than $25,000. In many counties, this court primarily hears criminal cases, while the Supreme Court primarily hears civil cases, and usually only felonies as lesser crimes are handled by local courts.

Structure 
A County Court operates in each county except for the five counties of New York City (in those counties, the New York City Courts and Supreme Court operate in place of a typical County Court). Unlike the Supreme Court, each County Court is considered distinct.

The County Court is authorized to establish "appellate sessions", an intermediate appellate court that hears appeals from the inferior courts. Appellate sessions are located in the Third and Fourth Judicial Departments only.

Judges 
Judges are elected to ten-year terms.

Appellate procedure 
Appeals in criminal cases originating in the County Court and in civil cases are taken to the Supreme Court, Appellate Division as of right, except for civil appeals in the Second Department, which are taken to the Appellate Term of the Supreme Court. In criminal matters in which the County Court acts as an appellate court, further appeal is to the Court of Appeals and may be taken only by permission of a judge of that court.

Notes

References

External links
 County Court
 County Court in the New York Codes, Rules and Regulations

New York (state) state courts
Courts and tribunals with year of establishment missing